See also 1696 in piracy, other events in 1697, 1698 in piracy and Timeline of piracy.

Events

Caribbean
May - Buccaneers under Jean du Casse assist French regulars in the siege of Cartagena.  After French troops sack the city and depart, the buccaneers are dissatisfied with their portion of the loot and plunder the city a second time.

Indian Ocean
Undated - Adam Baldridge flees Madagascar to avoid attack by neighbors for engaging in the slave trade.
October 30 - William Kidd murders his gunner, William Moore.

Births

Deaths

Piracy
Piracy by year